The 1989–90 NBA season was the Spurs' 14th season in the National Basketball Association, and 23rd season as a franchise. This marked the first NBA season for David Robinson, who was selected by the Spurs as the first overall pick in the 1987 NBA draft. In the 1989 NBA draft, the team had the third overall pick, and selected Sean Elliott from the University of Arizona, and acquired All-Star forward Terry Cummings from the Milwaukee Bucks, and acquired All-Star guard Maurice Cheeks and David Wingate from the Philadelphia 76ers during the off-season. The Spurs held a 32–14 record at the All-Star break, finished with a franchise-best 56–26 regular season record, first place in the Midwest Division, and surpassing the 53-win season of 1982–83.

As the 1980s ended, the 1989–90 season proved to be the rebirth of the Spurs franchise. With his tour of duty at the Navy over, Robinson arrived to the Spurs along with Elliott, Cummings and Cheeks, who only spent half the season in San Antonio, and was traded at midseason to the New York Knicks in exchange for second-year guard Rod Strickland. This season would mark a turning point for the franchise, the Spurs would miss the playoffs only once between 1990 and 2019 (that coming in 1996–97).

Although there was speculation that Robinson might choose not to sign with the Spurs and to become a free agent once his Navy commitment ended, Robinson decided to play in San Antonio.  Robinson joined the Spurs for the 1989-90 season, and he helped the team produce the second greatest single season turnaround in NBA history. Robinson had one of the most successful rookie seasons for a center in NBA history, finishing the season as the Rookie of the Year, averaging 24.3 points, 12.0 rebounds and 3.9 blocks per game, earning All-NBA Third Team, NBA All-Rookie First Team, and NBA All-Defensive Second Team honors, while being selected for the 1990 NBA All-Star Game, which was his first All-Star appearance. He also finished in sixth place in Most Valuable Player voting. In addition, Cummings averaged 22.4 points and 8.4 rebounds per game, while second-year guard Willie Anderson provided the team with 15.7 points, 4.4 assists and 1.4 steals per game, and Elliott contributed 10.0 points per game, and was named to the NBA All-Rookie Second Team.

In the Western Conference First Round of the playoffs, the Spurs swept the Denver Nuggets in three straight games. However, they would lose in a full seven game series to the Portland Trail Blazers in the Western Conference Semi-finals. The Blazers would lose to the defending champion Detroit Pistons in five games in the NBA Finals.

For the season, the Spurs introduced a new primary logo, which featured the fiesta colors of turquoise, fuchsia and orange. The uniforms remained silver and black, although starting this season, the team name "Spurs" replaced the city name "San Antonio" on the road jerseys. The "fiesta" logo and the new uniforms both remained in use until 2002.

Draft picks

Roster

Roster Notes
 Small forward Mike Mitchell was signed by the Spurs before the playoffs began. He did not play during the regular season.

Regular season
The Spurs went from 21–61 in the 1988–89 NBA season to 56–26 in 1989–90, for a remarkable 35-game improvement. They advanced to the second round of the Western Conference playoffs where they lost in seven games to the eventual western conference champions, the Portland Trail Blazers. Following the 1989–90 season, David Robinson was unanimously named the NBA Rookie of the Year, and subsequently SEGA produced a game featuring him entitled David Robinson's Supreme Court.

Season standings

Record vs. opponents

Game log

Regular season

|- align="center" bgcolor="#ccffcc"
| 1
| November 4
| L.A. Lakers
| W 106–98
|
|
|
| HemisFair Arena
| 1–0
|- align="center" bgcolor="#ffcccc"
| 2
| November 8
| Portland
| L 104–108
|
|
|
| HemisFair Arena
| 1–1
|- align="center" bgcolor="#ffcccc"
| 3
| November 10
| @ Utah
| L 92–106
|
|
|
| Salt Palace
| 1–2
|- align="center" bgcolor="#ccffcc"
| 4
| November 11
| Denver
| W 122–108
|
|
|
| HemisFair Arena
| 2–2
|- align="center" bgcolor="#ffcccc"
| 5
| November 14
| @ Milwaukee
| L 97–108
|
|
|
| Bradley Center
| 2–3
|- align="center" bgcolor="#ccffcc"
| 6
| November 15
| @ Minnesota
| W 86–76
|
|
|
| Hubert H. Humphrey Metrodome
| 3–3
|- align="center" bgcolor="#ffcccc"
| 7
| November 17
| @ Philadelphia
| L 101–108
|
|
|
| The Spectrum
| 3–4
|- align="center" bgcolor="#ccffcc"
| 8
| November 18
| @ New Jersey
| W 110–95
|
|
|
| Brendan Byrne Arena
| 4–4
|- align="center" bgcolor="#ccffcc"
| 9
| November 21
| Phoenix
| W 107–98
|
|
|
| HemisFair Arena
| 5–4
|- align="center" bgcolor="#ccffcc"
| 10
| November 24
| @ L.A. Clippers
| W 90–89
|
|
|
| Los Angeles Memorial Sports Arena
| 6–4
|- align="center" bgcolor="#ffcccc"
| 11
| November 26
| @ L.A. Lakers
| L 112–132
|
|
|
| Great Western Forum
| 6–5
|- align="center" bgcolor="#ccffcc"
| 12
| November 28
| Seattle
| W 117–104
|
|
|
| HemisFair Arena
| 7–5
|- align="center" bgcolor="#ccffcc"
| 13
| November 30
| Dallas
| W 93–89
|
|
|
| HemisFair Arena
| 8–5

|- align="center" bgcolor="#ccffcc"
| 14
| December 2
| Charlotte
| W 118–110
|
|
|
| HemisFair Arena
| 9–5
|- align="center" bgcolor="#ccffcc"
| 15
| December 6
| Golden State
| W 121–119
|
|
|
| HemisFair Arena
| 10–5
|- align="center" bgcolor="#ccffcc"
| 16
| December 8
| @ Dallas
| W 99–93
|
|
|
| Reunion Arena
| 11–5
|- align="center" bgcolor="#ccffcc"
| 17
| December 9
| New Jersey
| W 109–92
|
|
|
| HemisFair Arena
| 12–5
|- align="center" bgcolor="#ffcccc"
| 18
| December 12
| @ Atlanta
| L 94–102
|
|
|
| The Omni
| 12–6
|- align="center" bgcolor="#ccffcc"
| 19
| December 14
| Houston
| W 104–100
|
|
|
| HemisFair Arena
| 13–6
|- align="center" bgcolor="#ccffcc"
| 20
| December 16
| Orlando
| W 125–116
|
|
|
| HemisFair Arena
| 14–6
|- align="center" bgcolor="#ccffcc"
| 21
| December 20
| Sacramento
| W 103–100
|
|
|
| HemisFair Arena
| 15–6
|- align="center" bgcolor="#ccffcc"
| 22
| December 22
| @ Phoenix
| W 119–115
|
|
|
| Arizona Veterans Memorial Coliseum
| 16–6
|- align="center" bgcolor="#ccffcc"
| 23
| December 23
| Utah
| W 115–98
|
|
|
| HemisFair Arena
| 17–6
|- align="center" bgcolor="#ccffcc"
| 24
| December 26
| @ Charlotte
| W 107–82
|
|
|
| Charlotte Coliseum
| 18–6
|- align="center" bgcolor="#ccffcc"
| 25
| December 27
| @ Washington
| W 107–97
|
|
|
| Capital Centre
| 19–6
|- align="center" bgcolor="#ffcccc"
| 26
| December 29
| @ Chicago
| L 97–101
|
|
|
| Chicago Stadium
| 19–7

|- align="center" bgcolor="#ccffcc"
| 27
| January 3
| Philadelphia
| W 103–94
|
|
|
| HemisFair Arena
| 20–7
|- align="center" bgcolor="#ccffcc"
| 28
| January 6
| Minnesota
| W 109–96
|
|
|
| HemisFair Arena
| 21–7
|- align="center" bgcolor="#ffcccc"
| 29
| January 8
| @ Orlando
| L 102–111
|
|
|
| Orlando Arena
| 21–8
|- align="center" bgcolor="#ccffcc"
| 30
| January 9
| @ Miami
| W 107–102
|
|
|
| Miami Arena
| 22–8
|- align="center" bgcolor="#ccffcc"
| 31
| January 12
| @ Boston
| W 97–90
|
|
|
| Boston Garden
| 23–8
|- align="center" bgcolor="#ffcccc"
| 32
| January 13
| @ New York
| L 101–107
|
|
|
| Madison Square Garden
| 23–9
|- align="center" bgcolor="#ffcccc"
| 33
| January 15
| @ Cleveland
| L 89–92
|
|
|
| Richfield Coliseum
| 23–10
|- align="center" bgcolor="#ccffcc"
| 34
| January 17
| New York
| W 101–97
|
|
|
| HemisFair Arena
| 24–10
|- align="center" bgcolor="#ccffcc"
| 35
| January 19
| Cleveland
| W 104–101
|
|
|
| HemisFair Arena
| 25–10
|- align="center" bgcolor="#ffcccc"
| 36
| January 20
| @ Denver
| L 99–126
|
|
|
| McNichols Sports Arena
| 25–11
|- align="center" bgcolor="#ccffcc"
| 37
| January 22
| Washington
| W 124–115
|
|
|
| HemisFair Arena
| 26–11
|- align="center" bgcolor="#ccffcc"
| 38
| January 24
| L.A. Clippers
| W 106–98
|
|
|
| HemisFair Arena
| 25–13
|- align="center" bgcolor="#ffcccc"
| 39
| January 26
| @ Portland
| L 103–109
|
|
|
| Memorial Coliseum
| 26–13
|- align="center" bgcolor="#ffcccc"
| 40
| January 27
| @ Seattle
| L 98–109
|
|
|
| Seattle Center Coliseum
| 26–14
|- align="center" bgcolor="#ccffcc"
| 41
| January 29
| @ L.A. Lakers
| W 86–84
|
|
|
| Great Western Forum
| 28–13
|- align="center" bgcolor="#ccffcc"
| 42
| January 31
| Charlotte
| W 129–95
|
|
|
| HemisFair Arena
| 29–13

|- align="center" bgcolor="#ccffcc"
| 43
| February 2
| @ Charlotte
| W 118–107
|
|
|
| Charlotte Coliseum
| 30–13
|- align="center" bgcolor="#ccffcc"
| 44
| February 3
| Chicago
| W 112–111
|
|
|
| HemisFair Arena
| 31–13
|- align="center" bgcolor="#ccffcc"
| 45
| February 6
| Atlanta
| W 105–94
|
|
|
| HemisFair Arena
| 32–13
|- align="center" bgcolor="#ffcccc"
| 46
| February 8
| Indiana
| L 100–105
|
|
|
| HemisFair Arena
| 32–14
|- align="center" bgcolor="#ffcccc"
| 47
| February 13
| @ Dallas
| L 96–103
|
|
|
| Reunion Arena
| 32–15
|- align="center" bgcolor="#ffcccc"
| 48
| February 14
| Boston
| L 95–106
|
|
|
| HemisFair Arena
| 32–16
|- align="center" bgcolor="#ccffcc"
| 49
| February 16
| Utah
| W 100–86
|
|
|
| HemisFair Arena
| 33–16
|- align="center" bgcolor="#ccffcc"
| 50
| February 17
| @ Houston
| W 104–102
|
|
|
| The Summit
| 34–16
|- align="center" bgcolor="#ffcccc"
| 51
| February 20
| L.A. Lakers
| L 114–115 (OT)
|
|
|
| HemisFair Arena
| 34–17
|- align="center" bgcolor="#ccffcc"
| 52
| February 23
| Minnesota
| W 105–95
|
|
|
| HemisFair Arena
| 35–17
|- align="center" bgcolor="#ccffcc"
| 53
| February 25
| @ L.A. Clippers
| W 107–106
|
|
|
| Los Angeles Memorial Sports Arena
| 36–17
|- align="center" bgcolor="#ccffcc"
| 54
| February 26
| @ Sacramento
| W 105–96
|
|
|
| ARCO Arena
| 37–17
|- align="center" bgcolor="#ffcccc"
| 55
| February 28
| @ Golden State
| L 135–144 (OT)
|
|
|
| Oakland–Alameda County Coliseum Arena
| 37–18

|- align="center" bgcolor="#ccffcc"
| 56
| March 2
| Golden State
| W 131–115
|
|
|
| HemisFair Arena
| 38–18
|- align="center" bgcolor="#ffcccc"
| 57
| March 3
| @ Utah
| L 98–112
|
|
|
| Salt Palace
| 38–19
|- align="center" bgcolor="#ffcccc"
| 58
| March 5
| Houston
| L 105–109
|
|
|
| HemisFair Arena
| 38–20
|- align="center" bgcolor="#ccffcc"
| 59
| March 10
| Denver
| W 118–111
|
|
|
| HemisFair Arena
| 39–20
|- align="center" bgcolor="#ccffcc"
| 60
| March 12
| @ Minnesota
| W 92–88
|
|
|
| Hubert H. Humphrey Metrodome
| 40–20
|- align="center" bgcolor="#ccffcc"
| 61
| March 13
| @ Indiana
| W 103–102
|
|
|
| Market Square Arena
| 41–20
|- align="center" bgcolor="#ffcccc"
| 62
| March 15
| @ Detroit
| L 98–110
|
|
|
| Palace of Auburn Hills
| 41–21
|- align="center" bgcolor="#ccffcc"
| 63
| March 17
| Miami
| W 111–98
|
|
|
| HemisFair Arena
| 42–21
|- align="center" bgcolor="#ccffcc"
| 64
| March 19
| @ Phoenix
| W 113–102
|
|
|
| Arizona Veterans Memorial Coliseum
| 43–21
|- align="center" bgcolor="#ccffcc"
| 65
| March 20
| @ Seattle
| W 128–106
|
|
|
| Seattle Center Coliseum
| 44–21
|- align="center" bgcolor="#ccffcc"
| 66
| March 22
| Portland
| W 107–106
|
|
|
| HemisFair Arena
| 45–21
|- align="center" bgcolor="#ccffcc"
| 67
| March 24
| Detroit
| W 105–98
|
|
|
| HemisFair Arena
| 46–21
|- align="center" bgcolor="#ffcccc"
| 68
| March 26
| @ Houston
| L 95–113
|
|
|
| The Summit
| 46–22
|- align="center" bgcolor="#ccffcc"
| 69
| March 27
| Seattle
| W 115–103
|
|
|
| HemisFair Arena
| 47–22
|- align="center" bgcolor="#ffcccc"
| 70
| March 29
| Dallas
| L 105–109
|
|
|
| HemisFair Arena
| 47–23
|- align="center" bgcolor="#ccffcc"
| 71
| March 31
| Milwaukee
| W 107–100
|
|
|
| HemisFair Arena
| 48–23

|- align="center" bgcolor="#ffcccc"
| 72
| April 3
| Minnesota
| L 90–92
|
|
|
| HemisFair Arena
| 48–24
|- align="center" bgcolor="#ffcccc"
| 73
| April 4
| @ Dallas
| L 98–104
|
|
|
| Reunion Arena
| 48–25
|- align="center" bgcolor="#ccffcc"
| 74
| April 7
| @ Sacramento
| W 111–93
|
|
|
| ARCO Arena
| 49–25
|- align="center" bgcolor="#ffcccc"
| 75
| April 8
| @ Portland
| L 105–112
|
|
|
| Memorial Coliseum
| 49–26
|- align="center" bgcolor="#ccffcc"
| 76
| April 10
| @ Golden State
| W 132–122
|
|
|
| Oakland–Alameda County Coliseum Arena
| 50–26
|- align="center" bgcolor="#ccffcc"
| 77
| April 12
| L.A. Clippers
| W 105–98
|
|
|
| HemisFair Arena
| 51–26
|- align="center" bgcolor="#ccffcc"
| 78
| April 14
| Sacramento
| W 105–94
|
|
|
| HemisFair Arena
| 52–26
|- align="center" bgcolor="#ccffcc"
| 79
| April 16
| @ Charlotte
| W 110–101
|
|
|
| Charlotte Coliseum
| 53–26
|- align="center" bgcolor="#ccffcc"
| 80
| April 18
| Utah
| W 102–93
|
|
|
| HemisFair Arena
| 54–26
|- align="center" bgcolor="#ccffcc"
| 81
| April 20
| @ Denver
| W 112–108
|
|
|
| McNichols Sports Arena
| 55–26
|- align="center" bgcolor="#ccffcc"
| 82
| April 22
| Phoenix
| W 108–93
|
|
|
| HemisFair Arena
| 56–26

Playoffs

|- align="center" bgcolor="#ccffcc"
| 1
| April 26
| Denver
| W 119–103
| Willie Anderson (27)
| David Robinson (13)
| Rod Strickland (9)
| HemisFair Arena15,910
| 1–0
|- align="center" bgcolor="#ccffcc"
| 2
| April 28
| Denver
| W 129–120
| David Robinson (31)
| Terry Cummings (13)
| Rod Strickland (13)
| HemisFair Arena15,910
| 2–0
|- align="center" bgcolor="#ccffcc"
| 3
| May 1
| @ Denver
| W 131–120
| Terry Cummings (28)
| David Robinson (16)
| Rod Strickland (9)
| McNichols Sports Arena15,604
| 3–0
|-

|- align="center" bgcolor="#ffcccc"
| 1
| May 5
| @ Portland
| L 94–107
| Frank Brickowski (20)
| David Robinson (9)
| Rod Strickland (9)
| Memorial Coliseum12,884
| 0–1
|- align="center" bgcolor="#ffcccc"
| 2
| May 8
| @ Portland
| L 112–122
| Terry Cummings (33)
| David Robinson (8)
| Rod Strickland (14)
| Memorial Coliseum12,884
| 0–2
|- align="center" bgcolor="#ccffcc"
| 3
| May 10
| Portland
| W 121–98
| David Robinson (28)
| Strickland, Cummings (9)
| Rod Strickland (17)
| HemisFair Arena15,910
| 1–2
|- align="center" bgcolor="#ccffcc"
| 4
| May 12
| Portland
| W 115–105
| Terry Cummings (35)
| Terry Cummings (11)
| Rod Strickland (14)
| HemisFair Arena15,910
| 2–2
|- align="center" bgcolor="#ffcccc"
| 5
| May 15
| @ Portland
| L 132–138 (2OT)
| Terry Cummings (32)
| David Robinson (15)
| Rod Strickland (7)
| Memorial Coliseum12,884
| 2–3
|- align="center" bgcolor="#ccffcc"
| 6
| May 17
| Portland
| W 112–97
| Willie Anderson (30)
| David Robinson (13)
| Rod Strickland (12)
| HemisFair Arena15,910
| 3–3
|- align="center" bgcolor="#ffcccc"
| 7
| May 19
| @ Portland
| L 105–108 (OT)
| Terry Cummings (27)
| David Robinson (16)
| Rod Strickland (8)
| Memorial Coliseum12,884
| 3–4
|-

Player statistics

Regular season

Playoffs

Award winners
David Robinson, NBA All-Star
David Robinson, NBA Rookie of the Year
David Robinson, All-NBA Rookie First Team
David Robinson, All-NBA Team, Third Team
David Robinson, All-NBA Defensive Second Team
Sean Elliott, All-NBA Rookie Second Team
Bob Bass, NBA Executive of the Year

References

External links
 San Antonio Spurs on Database Basketball
 San Antonio Spurs on Basketball Reference

San Antonio Spurs seasons
San
San Antonio
San Antonio